Temple Israel is a Reform Jewish synagogue in Minneapolis, Minnesota. Founded in 1878, it is the oldest synagogue in Minneapolis and one of the largest Jewish congregations in the United States.

Early history 
Temple Israel, originally called Shaarai Tov ("Gates of Goodness"), was founded in 1878 by German-speaking Jewish merchants. Their first house of worship, built in 1880, was located on Fifth Street between First Avenue (later Marquette Avenue) and Second Avenue South; it was a small, wooden synagogue in the popular Moorish Revival style. In 1888, the congregation moved to Tenth Street and Fifth Avenue South. When the synagogue burned down in 1902, the congregants erected a new synagogue in stone on the site of the lost building.

In 1901, Shaarai Tov hired Rabbi Samuel N. Deinard, an influential rabbi who helped grow the congregation. He acted as mediator between his Americanized congregants and the Eastern European Jewish immigrants who lived in North Minneapolis. Deinard also founded a local Jewish weekly newspaper, the American Jewish World, in 1912. In 1914, the congregation moved to its current location, this time to the corner of West Twenty-Fourth Street and Emerson Avenue South. In 1920, Shaarai Tov became Reform and changed their name to Temple Israel. In September 1912, Deinard organized a visit from Baháʼí Faith leader `Abdu'l-Bahá—visiting Minneapolis while on a speaking tour of the U.S.–who gave a public talk on Baháʼí teachings and the spiritualization of society at Temple Israel. In 1928, a new synagogue was built on the same site, this time by the firm of Jack Liebenberg and Seeman Kaplan; this neoclassical revival-style building remains a landmark overlooking Hennepin Avenue in Uptown Minneapolis.

Rabbi Deinard died suddenly and unexpectedly in 1921. His successor was Rabbi Albert Minda, who acted as head rabbi from 1922 to 1963. Rabbi Max Shapiro, Temple Israel's assistant rabbi since 1955, succeeded Minda and was named rabbi emeritus in 1985.

Recent events 
Marcia Zimmerman was hired as assistant rabbi in 1988, and in 2001, was named senior rabbi, making her the first woman senior rabbi of a congregation of more than two thousand families in the United States.

Hammel, Green and Abrahamson (HGA) designed a 21 million expansion including a lobby and an education center that was completed in fall 2016.

See also 
 List of Synagogues in Minnesota
 List of Synagogues named Temple Israel

References

Further reading 
 Lewin, Rhoda G. (1987). Temple Israel, a brief history: 1878-1987. Minneapolis, Minn: Temple Israel.
 Minda, Albert G. (1971). The Story of Temple Israel, Minneapolis, Minnesota: A Personal Account. Minneapolis, Minn.: Lund Press.

External links 
Official website
Finding aid to the Temple Israel records at the Upper Midwest Jewish Archives, University of Minnesota Libraries.

Jews and Judaism in Minneapolis–Saint Paul
Reform synagogues in Minnesota
Moorish Revival synagogues
Neoclassical synagogues
Religious organizations established in 1878
Moorish Revival architecture in Minnesota